Rui Águas may refer to:
Rui Águas (footballer) (born 1960), former Portuguese football striker
Rui Águas (racing driver) (born 1972), Portuguese driver